Ethlyn is an unincorporated community in Lincoln County, in the U.S. state of Missouri.

History
A post office called Ethlyn was established in 1904, and remained in operation until 1957. The community has the name of one Ethlyn Brown.

References

Unincorporated communities in Lincoln County, Missouri
Unincorporated communities in Missouri